Flightline may refer to:
 Flightline (airline) - former British airline company
 Flightline (horse) - American thoroughbred racehorse